John Lea is a British left realist criminologist. For many years he was based at the Centre for Criminology and the Crime and Conflict Research Centre, Middlesex University in the United Kingdom.

Career

He graduated from the London School of Economics and Political Science, University of London with a BSc in Economics in 1967, before gaining MSc's in Economics and Social Policy there too.

From 1997 until his retirement in 2003 he was Professor of Criminology at Middlesex University. He has subsequently been visiting Professor at the Universities of Brighton, Leicester, Roehampton and Goldsmiths (University of London)

Work

His research interests include policing, organised crime, the historical development of crime and criminal justice institutions, the role of the private sector in criminal justice and the relationship between crime, war and security.

Lea was one of the key founders of the left realist approach alongside Jock Young, Roger Matthews, Richard Kinsey and Ian Taylor, His book with Jock Young, 'What is to be Done About Law and Order?' (1984) was a founding text of the left realist school. This was followed by, (with Richard Kinsey and Jock Young) 'Losing the Fight Against Crime'(1986).

In 2015 he was awarded the British Society of Criminology Outstanding Achievement Award. (presented at the BSC Conference, Plymouth University, July)

Publications and articles

1970s

Fine, B., Kinsey, R., Lea, J., Picciotto, S. & Young, J. (eds) (1979) Capitalism and the Rule of Law, London: Hutchinson

1980s

Lea, J. & Young, J. (1981) "The Riots in Britain 1981" In: Cowell, D., Jones, T. & Young, J. (eds) Policing the Riots, London: Junction
Lea, J. & Young, J. (1982) "Race and Crime", Marxism Today, August pg.38-39
Lea, J. & Young, J. (1984) What Is To Be Done About Law and Order — Crisis in the Eighties. Harmondsworth: Penguin. (Pluto Press revised edition: 1993) 
Kinsey, R., Lea, J. & Young, J. (1986). Losing the Fight Against Crime. London: Blackwell. 
Lea, J. (1986) 'Police Racism: some theories and their policy implication' in Matthews, R. & Young, J. (eds) Confronting Crime, London: Sage Publications.
Jones, T., Lea, J. & Young, J. (1987) Saving the Inner City: The First Report of the Broadwater Farm Survey, London: Middlesex Polytechnic
Lea, J., Matthews, R. & Young, J. (1987) Law and Order: Five Years On, London: Middlesex Polytechnic, Centre for Criminology
Lea J. (1987) 'Left Realism in Criminology: A Defence' (Contemporary Crises No 11) pp 357–370 
Lea, J., Jones, T., Woodhouse, T. & Young, J. (1989) Preventing Crime: The Hilldrop Environmental Improvement Survey, Enfield: Centre for Criminology, Middlesex Polytechnic
Painter, K., Lea, J., Woodhouse, T. & Young, J. (1989) The Hammersmith and Fulham Crime and Policing Survey, London: Middlesex Polytechnic, Centre for Criminology

1990s

2000s

Lea J. (2000) ‘The Macpherson Report and the Question of Institutional Racism’ Howard Journal of Criminal Justice  vol 39 No 3.pp 219–233
Lea J. (2002). Crime and Modernity: Continuities in Left Realist Criminology. London: Sage. 
Lea J. (2004) 'Hitting Criminals where it hurts: organised crime and the erosion of due process' Cambrian Law Review  vol 35: 81-9 
Lea, J. (2010) 'Left Realism, Community and State Building' Crime, Law and Social Change 54: 141-158. 
Lea, J. (2011) (with Simon Hallsworth) 'Reconstructing Leviathan: Emerging contours of the security state' Theoretical Criminology 15(2): 141-157 
Lea, J. (2012) (with Peter Squires) Criminalisation and advanced marginality: critically exploring the work of Loic Wacquant. Bristol: Policy Press  
Lea, J. (2015) 'From the Criminalisation of War to the Militarisation of Crime Control' in Sandra Walklate & Ross McGarry eds. Criminology and War: Transgressing the Borders. London: Routledge
Lea, J, (2016) War, Criminal Justice and the Rebirth of Privatisation' in Ross McGarry and Sandra Walklate eds. The Palgrave Handbook of Criminology and War. London: Palgrave
Lea, J. (2016) Left realism: A radical criminology for the current crisis. International Journal for Crime, Justice and Social Democracy 5(3): DOI: 10.5204/ijcjsd.v5i3.329
Lea, J. (2017)  (With Wendy Fitzgibbon) 'Privatisation and coercion: The question of legitimacy' Theoretical Criminology. (online May 2017)
Lea, J. (2020) (With Wendy Fitzgibbon) Privatising Justice: the security industry, war and crime control. London: Pluto

References

British sociologists
Academics of Middlesex University
British criminologists
Living people
Year of birth missing (living people)